Andrea Kertészová (born 4 November 1988) is a Slovak handball player for HK Slovan Duslo Šaľa and the Slovak national team.

References

1988 births
Living people
Slovak female handball players